Go.Compare (formerly GoCompare.com) is a British financial services comparison company based in Newport, Wales. Its website provides comparison details for financial products including car insurance, home and pet insurance and breakdown cover. Since 2021 it has been owned by Future plc. The company is known for its advertising campaign, which in 2015 was voted as the "most irritating advertisement."

History
Goco was established in November 2006 and is based in Newport, Wales. The company's founder was Hayley Parsons, who worked for Admiral Insurance for 14 years, and was formerly head of business development at Confused.com. Parsons was replaced as CEO by Jon Morrell following a takeover by insurance company esure in March 2015 

It was the first comparison site to focus on features of insurance products rather than just listing prices, which led to the company being invited to become a member of the British Insurance Brokers Association (BIBA).

The company, which at the time was 49% owned by insurance company esure, posted a pre-tax profit of £34.7 million for 2011, up 15% on the previous year.

On 8 December 2014, esure acquired Goco in a deal worth £95 million. In November 2016 the company was the subject of a demerger from esure.

In November 2017, ZPG's offer to buy the company for £460 million was rejected.

In December 2017, GoCompare announced the acquisition of MyVoucherCodes, one of the UK's largest online voucher code sites, in a £36.5m deal.

In November 2020, GoCompare agreed to a £594m takeover offer from Future plc, Britain’s biggest magazines publisher.

Services
GoCompare provides a comparison service for vehicle, life insurance in conjunction with its partners Neilson Financial Services, home and pet insurance, and breakdown cover. It also provides comparison services for travel insurance, gas and electricity, broadband, loans, credit cards, mortgages and other financial products through preferred providers such as Energylinx and Experian. On 14 August 2012, the company launched "Covered mag", an online magazine that claims to be "unlike any other financial publication you've ever read".

Advertising
In June 2009 the company launched an advertising campaign featuring a fictional Italian tenor called Gio Compario, played by Wynne Evans. The advertisements feature 'Gio' singing the 'Go Compare' tune (inspired by Over There) in various locations, and in 2015 were voted "most irritating advertisement".

In response to this reaction, Go Compare deliberately subverted the campaign in July 2012 by running a series of adverts where celebrity guests such as Sue Barker, Jimmy Carr, Stuart Pearce, Ray Mears, Louie Spence and Stephen Hawking lined up to "silence" the character of Gio Compario. Marketing officer Kevin Hughes said, "It was risky, but a brand has to listen to its customers." The character returned in July 2015 after an 18-month break, singing as part of what Evans called a "much calmer performance". The character appeared again in 2020 after the coronavirus lockdown measures were eased in the UK in July 2020.

Public image
In September 2007 the company admitted that, on one occasion, an unlawful breach of privacy had taken place with regard to the passing on of data provided by customers. It said that this was the result of a breach of contract by a sub-contractor, Performance Direct, and stated that it would take immediate action to prevent it happening again.

In January 2008 the site was blacklisted for a time by Google due to "irregular inbound links". This resulted in its share of search traffic for the term "car insurance" reducing from 17.49% to 2.31%. Gocompare.com was blacklisted again in April 2009.

In August 2019 the company received criticism from road safety organisations after debuting an advert depicting the Gio Compario character crashing into a tree and flipping over. The Advertising Standards Authority received over 70 complaints regarding the advertisement.

References

External links
 

Companies based in Newport, Wales
Vehicle insurance
Financial services companies established in 2006
Comparison shopping websites
Online financial services companies of the United Kingdom
2006 establishments in the United Kingdom